Cortes, officially the Municipality of Cortes (Surigaonon: Lungsod nan Cortes), is a 4th class municipality in the province of Surigao del Sur, Philippines. According to the 2020 census, it has a population of 17,924 people.

Cortes faces the Philippine Sea on the eastern part. It has a protected marine sanctuary located in barangay Balibadon, Capandan, Mabahin, Poblacion, Tigao, Uba and Tag-anongan. It is known in the province of Surigao del Sur for its rich source of sea foods in the area. You can find different kinds of fish, crabs, etc. It has beaches with white sands and water falls. It also has a bird sanctuary located in barangay Burgos. It also has a wide area for agriculture. It has two season, rainy and sunny.

History

Cortes was originally known as "Kagyunod". It cannot be traced who changed Kagyunod into Cortes but many believed that Cortes derived its name after Governor General Cortes who was assigned to the Philippines by the Spanish King.

Cortes was once part of Tandag. It gained its independence on October 1, 1953, by virtue of Executive Order No. 642 series of 1953 creating Cortes into an independent municipal or corporation. It was not until March 19, 1954, however, that the new local government unit formally started to function with the assumption into office of the first set of municipal officials appointed by then President Elpidio R. Quirino.

Geography

Cortes lies between 9 deg. 08'00 N to 9 deg. 19'00 North latitude and 126 deg. 03'00 to 126 deg. 13'00 East longitude or lies in the mid-eastern portion of Surigao del Sur along the Pacific Coast. It is 28 kilometers from Tandag, the capital of the province. Cortes is bounded on the east by the vast Pacific Ocean, on the north by the Municipality of Lanuza and Lanuza Bay, on the south by the municipality of Tandag, and on the west by the municipalities of Lanuza and Tandag.

Cortes has a land area of 13,509.00 hectares. It comprises 12 barangays with Balibadon and Tag-anongan as the biggest and smallest barangays respectively.

Cortes has numerous rolling hills and uneven distribution of lowlands. Mabahin, Tigao and Burgos have a large area of rice and swamplands, the rest of the barangays are generally hilly. The south-western portion of the town is generally mountainous and covered with second growth forest.

Barangays

Cortes is politically subdivided into 12 barangays. In 1955, the sitios of Uba, Mabahin, Tag-anongan and Manlico were converted into barrios.

 Balibadon
 Burgos
 Capandan
 Mabahin
 Madrelino
 Manlico
 Matho
 Poblacion
 Tag-anongan
 Tigao
 Tuboran
 Uba

Climate

Demographics

Economy

Agriculture is the major source of living in Cortes. It is also known for its rich source of sea foods. Fishing is one source of living. However, there are limitations that been lay down by the local government to protect their sea against abuse. Farming is the second source of living.

Tourism
Attractions include:
 Laswitan Lagoon (a 20-foot rock formation with three lagoons; name derives from the word "laswit" which means splash; when the water is high, especially during Amihan season, it creates huge waves that will splash on the rocks and creates a waterfall effect)
 Bakwitan Cave
 Lubcon Falls
 Bugsay Beach Resort
 Sihagan Beach
 Buybuyan Beach
 La Soledad Beach

Culture

Festivals
Kadagatan Festival – Every 21st to 24th day of July, the town of Cortes celebrates Kadagatan Festival. This festival is celebrated because of the abundance of fishes and other seafoods that Cortes have. The Rabita Statue symbolize this festival. You can see the statue in Cortes Commercial Triangle.

Araw ng Cortes – Every 29th day of September up to 1st day of October, Cortes celebrates Araw ng Cortes. This is because Cortes have its freedom from being separated from Tandag City.

References

External links
 Cortes Profile at PhilAtlas.com
   Cortes Profile at the DTI Cities and Municipalities Competitive Index
 [ Philippine Standard Geographic Code]
 Philippine Census Information
 Local Governance Performance Management System

Municipalities of Surigao del Sur
Establishments by Philippine executive order